Aeroflot Flight 964 was a flight operated by Aeroflot from Kutaisi Airport, Georgia to Domodedovo Airport, Moscow, Russian SFSR. On 13 October 1973, the Tupolev Tu-104 operating on the route crashed during its approach to Moscow, killing all 122 passengers and crew on board. It remains the deadliest accident involving a Tupolev Tu-104.

Aircraft 
The aircraft involved in the accident was a Tupolev Tu-104B, registered СССР-42486 to the Georgia division of Aeroflot.  Originally the aircraft cabin had 100 seats, but it was later reconfigured for 115 seats.  At the time of the accident, the aircraft had 16,250 flight hours and sustained 9,776 pressurization cycles.

Crew 
Eight crew members were aboard the flight.  The cockpit crew consisted of:
 Captain Georgy Iraklievich Kurtsidze
 Co-pilot Karmen Semenovich Ratiani
 Navigator Boris Grigorievich Yegoyan
 Flight Engineer Devi Alexandrovich Zakariadze
 Radio operator Gurami Georgievich Lominadze
Flight attendants R.K. Nubarova and D.I. Rusova worked in the cabin, along with an officer of the Ministry of Internal Affairs monitoring the flight.

Synopsis 
The flight departed Kutaisi Airport at 18:10 with 114 passengers aboard. Eight passengers boarded the flight illegally. At 19:52 the Tu-104 was handed over to Moscow air traffic control. At 20:13:28 the crew reported that they were on a bearing of 317° (opposite to the runway) and at 20:15:55 the pilots informed the controller that they were having issues with their compass, while at an altitude of 900 metres. No more radio transmissions were heard from the flight.

Causes 
The investigation concluded that after the first right turn executed by the aircraft (in which the bank exceeded 40°), multiple navigation instruments including the compass and artificial horizon failed.  Combined with the poor visibility at the airport, the crew lost spatial orientation and were unable to see any landmarks to determine their position.  When the plane banked slightly to the right, the pilots corrected the right bank only to put the plane into a sharp left bank that reached 70°, causing the crash.

See also 

 Aeroflot Flight 1912, a Tupolev Tu-104 crash caused by similar mechanical failures.
 Aeroflot Flight 2415, a Tupolev Tu-104, crashed during takeoff after experiencing similar failure of the artificial horizon.
 Aeroflot Flight 3932, also a Tupolev Tu-104, crashed during approach to Moscow experiencing failures of the compass and artificial horizon.
Flash Airlines Flight 604

References 

Accidents and incidents involving the Tupolev Tu-104
Aviation accidents and incidents in the Soviet Union
Airliner accidents and incidents caused by electrical failure
Aviation accidents and incidents in 1973
1973 in the Soviet Union
964
October 1973 events in Europe
Airliner accidents and incidents caused by instrument failure